Trezzano may refer to:

 Trezzano sul Naviglio, a comune in the Metropolitan City of Milan in the Italian region Lombardy
 Trezzano Rosa, a comune in the Province of Milan in the Italian region Lombardy

See also 
 Trezzo (disambiguation)